Palay Khan  (1888-1951), also referred to as Palay Shah, was an ethnic Pashtun from the Kakar tribe, freedom fighter and commander of the group that fought against the British Raj in 1930, at Baluchistan (a Commissionerate Province).

References 

Pashtun people
People from Balochistan, Pakistan
People from Zhob District
1888 births
1951 deaths